The 1889 Georgetown football team represented the Georgetown University during the 1889 college football season.  Georgetown finished the season with a 5–1 record.  This season included the first match against a full collegiate team, Virginia.  Georgetown's records show this game as a 34–0 victory for the team, while Virginia's record a 32–0 victory for the Cavaliers.

Schedule

References

Georgetown
Georgetown Hoyas football seasons
Georgetown football